Prelude No. 1 is a guitar piece written by Brazilian composer Heitor Villa-Lobos.

Music 
The piece is subtitled "Melodia lírica" (Lyrical Melody), is in E minor, marked "Andantino espressivo", and is the first of the Five Preludes, written in 1940. The others are in E major, A minor, E minor, and D major. It was first performed, together with its four companions, by Abel Carlevaro in Montevideo on 11 December 1942.

This piece follows a ternary form which consists of a slow, yearning A section in E minor. The B section is more upbeat and lively in the key of E major.

Discography
The composer himself once recorded this prelude:
 Villa-Lobos, O Intérprete. Prelude No. 1 and Chôros No. 1 (Villa-Lobos, guitar); Chôros No. 5, A lenda do caboclo, and "Polichinelo" from A prole do bebe (Villa-Lobos, piano; "Um canto que saiu das senzalas", "Guriata do coqueiro", "Nhapopê", and "Xangô" (Beate Roseroiter, soprano; Villa-Lobos, piano). Caravelle LP MEC/MVL 002.

References

Further reading
 Appleby, David P. 1988. Heitor Villa-Lobos: A Bio-Bibliography New York: Greenwood Press. .
 Béhague, Gerard. 1994. Villa-Lobos: The Search for Brazil's Musical Soul. Austin: Institute of Latin American Studies, University of Texas at Austin. .
 Santos, Turíbio. 1985. Heitor Villa-Lobos and the Guitar, translated by Victoria Forde and Graham Wade. Gurtnacloona, Bantry, County Cork: Wise Owl Music. 
 Wright, Simon. 1992. Villa-Lobos. Oxford Studies of Composers. Oxford and New York: Oxford University Press.  (cloth);  (pbk).

External links

 , Miloš Karadaglić

Compositions by Heitor Villa-Lobos
1940 compositions
Villa
Compositions in E minor